Bantaeng Regency (Kabupaten Bantaeng) is a regency of South Sulawesi Province in Indonesia. It covers an area of 395.83 km2 and had a population of 176,984 at the 2010 Census, rising to 196,716 at the 2020 Census. The official estimate as at mid 2021 was 197,886. The administrative centre is the town of Bantaeng (historically, Bonthain), which lies on the south coast of the southern peninsula of Sulawesi island.

Administration 
Bantaeng Regency is divided into eight Districts (Kecamatan), tabulated below with their areas and their populations at the 2010 Census and the 2020 Census, as well as according to the official estimates for mid 2021. The table also includes the locations of the district administrative centres, the numbers of villages in each district (totalling 46 rural desa and 21 urban kelurahan), and its post codes.

Notes: (a) includes 7 kelurahan and 4 desa. (b) includes 8 kelurahan and 1 desa. (c) includes 4 kelurahan and 6 desa. (d) includes 2 kelurahan and 4 desa.

Climate
Bantaeng has a tropical savanna climate (Aw) with moderate to little rainfall from July to November and heavy rainfall from December to June.

Beaches
Bantaeng Regency has 3 beaches:
 Lamalaka Beach
 Seruni Beach
 Marina Beach and Resort
The previous 2 beaches is near the administrative centre, Bantaeng, and the last beach is 18 kilometers southeast of Lamalaka Beach.

References

Regencies of South Sulawesi